Snaking may refer to:

Use of plumber's snake
Snaking (logging), a way of moving timber in logging
Undulating motion
 A technique used in Mario Kart DS to boost speed